The 2007–08 Ohio State Buckeyes men's basketball finished in fifth place in the Big Ten, squarely on the NCAA tournament bubble.  However, they were not selected, marking the only time in coach Thad Matta's head coaching career his team missed the NCAA tournament while being eligible.   The team dominated in the 2008 National Invitation Tournament on their way to a 92–85 victory over Massachusetts in the final.

Preseason
The Buckeyes lost three important players from their 2006–07 NCAA Runners-up team to the NBA draft. Greg Oden, the 2007 Second Team All-American, was selected in the lottery of the 2007 NBA Draft, going #1 to the Portland Trail Blazers. Mike Conley, Jr. and Daequan Cook also were drafted in the first round, by the Memphis Grizzlies and Philadelphia 76ers, but traded to Miami Heat, respectively. Senior guard Ron Lewis also declared to the draft but went undrafted.

Recruiting

|-
!colspan=6| Junior College/Transfers

Roster

2007–08 Schedule

|-
!colspan=9| Exhibition

|-
!colspan=9| Regular season

|-
!colspan=9| Big Ten tournament

|-
!colspan=9| NIT tournament

Awards and honors
 Kosta Koufos, NIT Most Valuable Player

Team players drafted into the NBA

2008 Recruiting Class

|-
!colspan=6| Junior College/Transfers

References

Ohio State
Ohio State
National Invitation Tournament championship seasons
Ohio State Buckeyes men's basketball seasons
Ohio State Buckeyes
Ohio State Buckeyes